The 50th Arizona State Legislature, consisting of the Arizona State Senate and the Arizona House of Representatives, was constituted in Phoenix from January 1, 2011, to December 31, 2012, during the first two years of Jan Brewer's first full term in office. Both the Senate and the House membership remained constant at 30 and 60, respectively. The Republicans gained three seats in the Senate, increasing their majority to 21–9. The Republicans also gained five seats in the lower chamber, giving them a 40–20 majority.

Sessions
The Legislature met for two regular sessions at the State Capitol in Phoenix. The first opened on January 10, 2011, and adjourned on April 20, while the Second Regular Session convened on January 9, 2012, and adjourned sine die on May 3.

There were four Special Sessions, the first of which was convened on January 19, 2011, and adjourned on January 20; the second convened on February 14, 2011, and adjourned sine die on February 16; the third convened on February 14, 2011, and adjourned sine die February 16; and the fourth convened on November 11, 2011, and adjourned sine die later that same day.

State Senate

Members

The asterisk (*) denotes members of the previous Legislature who continued in office as members of this Legislature.

House of Representatives

Members 
The asterisk (*) denotes members of the previous Legislature who continued in office as members of this Legislature.

References

Arizona legislative sessions
2011 in Arizona
2012 in Arizona
2011 U.S. legislative sessions
2012 U.S. legislative sessions